WLLV (1240 AM) is a radio station broadcasting an urban gospel format. Licensed to Louisville, Kentucky, United States, the station serves the Louisville, KY-IN market area. The station is currently owned by New Albany Broadcasting Co., Inc.

The station signed on in 1941 as WINN (AM), a pop station and Mutual Radio Network affiliate. In 1965, the station turned to Country & Western music and remained so until late 1982, when it was sold to a group of African-American pastors from the Chicago, Illinois area. The format changed to southern gospel music, and the call letters changed from WINN to WLLV.

WLLV's sister station in the Louisville market is urban gospel WLOU (1350 AM). Occasionally, WLLV and WLOU will simulcast programming to take advantage of WLLV's better nighttime coverage. Popular announcers through the southern gospel programming years (1983- ) include Pastor James Ford, Eld. Ben Higgins, Min. Ben Walker, Min. Sylvia Walker, Archie Dale (gospel singer, former GM), and Bishop (Rev.) D.V. Lyons.

The current General Manager is W.H. (Bill) Price.

WLLV has undergone a temporary power reduction from 1,000 watts (unlimited hours) to 530 watts (unlimited hours) due to the relocation of their tower for a sewer district project. Management hopes to have the situation with WLLV's signal (and sister station WLOU's) corrected soon.

References

External links

FCC History Cards for WLLV

Southern Gospel radio stations in the United States
LLV
Gospel radio stations in the United States
Radio stations established in 1941
1941 establishments in Kentucky
LLV